This article lists events that occurred during 1946 in Estonia.

Incumbents
First Secretary of the Communist Party of Estonia  – Nikolai Karotamm

Events
Institute of Theology of Estonian Evangelical Lutheran Church was established.
Estonian SSR Academy of Sciences is established.

Births
21 July – Jüri Tarmak, high jumper, Olympic winner in 1972
11 May – Ago Roo, actor 
6 November – Viivi Luik, writer

Deaths

References

 
1940s in Estonia
Estonia
Estonia
Years of the 20th century in Estonia